Bryant Homer Womack (May 12, 1931March 12, 1952) was a United States Army soldier during the Korean War. He posthumously received the Medal of Honor for his actions on March 12, 1952. Womack Army Medical Center, Fort Bragg, North Carolina, is named for him.

Early life and education
Womack was born and raised in Mill Spring, in Polk County, North Carolina. He was the son of George and Julie Womack and had three brothers and one sister. He grew up working as a farm laborer and picked peaches during the summer. He enjoyed hunting, fishing, and riding bicycles.

Career
Womack was drafted into the U.S. Army in 1950 and sent to Korea as a private first class with the Medical Company of the 14th Infantry Regiment, 25th Infantry Division. During a firefight on March 12, 1952, near Soksa-ri, his unit began taking heavy casualties. Womack exposed himself to enemy fire in order to treat wounded soldiers. When he was himself wounded, he refused medical treatment and continued to give aid to others. He was the last soldier to withdraw from the engagement and died of his injuries soon after. He was officially issued the Medal of Honor the next year, on January 12, 1953.

Aged 20 at his death, Womack was buried at Lebanon Methodist Church in his hometown of Mill Spring.

Medal of Honor citation
Rank and organization: Private First Class, U.S. Army, Medical Company, 14th Infantry Regiment, 25th Infantry Division

Place and date: Near Sokso-ri, Korea, March 12, 1952

Entered service at: Mill Springs, N.C. Birth: Mill Springs, North Carolina

G.O. No.: 5, January 12, 1953

Citation:

See also
List of Korean War Medal of Honor recipients
Womack Army Medical Center - Named after Private Womack in 1958.

References

External links

1931 births
1952 deaths
United States Army Medal of Honor recipients
American military personnel killed in the Korean War
People from Polk County, North Carolina
Korean War recipients of the Medal of Honor
Combat medics
United States Army soldiers
United States Army personnel of the Korean War